Edmund Sheriffe was a priest and academic in the 15th century.

Sheriffe was a prebendary of Lincoln Cathedral from 1458; Rector of Little Billing from 1467; Archdeacon of Stow from 1471 and Master of Gonville Hall, Cambridge from 1472, holding all four positions until his death on 29 September 1475.

References 

Masters of Gonville Hall, Cambridge
15th-century English people
Archdeacons of Stow
1475 deaths